DZCV (684 AM) Radyo Sanggunian is a radio station owned and operated by Filipinas Broadcasting Network. The station's studio and transmitter are located at Maribbay St. Ext., Brgy. Ugac Norte, Tuguegarao. Operates daily from 4:00 AM to 9:00 PM.

DZCV is home to Cagayan Valley's pioneering amateur singing contest, Addan Ta Kabitunan. It went on air 3 years before Tawag Ng Tanghalan came to existence.

References

Radio stations in Cagayan
News and talk radio stations in the Philippines
Radio stations established in 1961